Handley Page Limited was a British aerospace manufacturer. Founded by Frederick Handley Page (later Sir Frederick) in 1909, it was the United Kingdom's first publicly traded aircraft manufacturing company. It went into voluntary liquidation and ceased to exist in 1970. The company, based at Radlett Aerodrome in Hertfordshire, was noted for its pioneering role in aviation history and for producing heavy bombers and large airliners.

History

Frederick Handley Page first experimented with and built several biplanes and monoplanes at premises in Woolwich, Fambridge and Barking Creek. His company, founded on 17 June 1909, became the first British public company to build aircraft.

In 1912, Handley Page established an aircraft factory at Cricklewood after moving from Barking. Aircraft were built there, and flown from the company's adjacent airfield known as Cricklewood Aerodrome, which was later used by Handley Page Transport. The factory was later sold off to Oswald Stoll and converted into Britain's largest film studios, Cricklewood Studios.

World War I
During the First World War, Handley Page produced a series of heavy bombers for the Royal Navy to bomb the German Zeppelin yards, with the ultimate intent of bombing Berlin in revenge for the Zeppelin attacks on London. Handley Page had been asked by the Admiralty to produce a "bloody paralyser of an aeroplane". These aircraft included the O/100 of 1915, the O/400 of 1918 and the four-engined V/1500 with the range to reach Berlin. The V/1500 had only just entered operational service as the war ended in 1918.

The Handley Page factory at Radlett Aerodrome employed women as part of the war effort, and was visited by royalty.

Interwar period
In early 1919, a Handley Page V/1500 aircraft, dubbed Atlantic, was shipped to Newfoundland to attempt the world's first non-stop Transatlantic flight; only to be beaten by a Vickers Vimy piloted by Alcock and Brown in June of that year. The Atlantic flew into New York City via Canada on 9 October 1919, carrying the first airmail from Canada to the United States of America.

In the immediate postwar years, Handley Page modified a number of O/400's to passenger use, which they flew on the London-Paris route as Handley Page Transport. The V/1500 was considered too large to be practical at the time, but a number of design features of the V/1500 were later incorporated into an O/400 airframe to produce their first dedicated passenger design, the W.8 that led to a series of similar airliners, fitted with two or three engines, which, aside from being used by Handley Page Transport, were also exported to Belgium.

In 1924 Handley Page Transport merged with two other airlines to create Imperial Airways, as the UK's national airline service, which continued to use a number of the W.8, W.9 and W.10 series of airliners. Handley Page continued to develop large biplane airliners, including the luxurious Handley Page H.P.42, for use on Imperial routes to Africa and India.

Handley Page developed the Handley Page Slat (or slot), an auxiliary airfoil mounted ahead and above the wing, which formed a narrow gap which improved airflow at high angles of attack and improved low speed handling. The leading edge slat was simultaneously designed by the German aerodynamicist Gustav Lachmann, who was later employed by Handley Page. The design was so successful that licensing fees to other companies was their main source of income in the early 1920s.

In 1929, Cricklewood Aerodrome was closed and Handley Page moved aircraft final assembly to Radlett Aerodrome. Cricklewood Aerodrome was taken over by Cricklewood Studios, the largest film studio in the UK at that time. Manufacture of aircraft parts and sub-assemblies continued until 1964 at Cricklewood when the remainder of the site was sold off and a Wickes home renovation store currently occupies the site.

World War II
With the Second World War looming, Handley Page designed and produced the HP.52 Hampden bomber, which took part in the first British raid on Berlin.

In response to a 1936 government request for heavier, longer ranged aircraft, Handley Page tendered the HP.56 design powered by twin Rolls-Royce Vultures and this was ordered, along with what became the Avro Manchester. However the Vulture proved so troublesome that – years before the engine was abandoned by Rolls-Royce in 1940 – the Air Staff decided that the HP.56 should be fitted with four engines instead. Therefore, before reaching prototype stage, the HP.56 design was reworked into the four-engined HP.57 Halifax. The Halifax became the second most-prolific British heavy bomber of the war after the Avro Lancaster (itself essentially a four-engine development of the Manchester). Although in some respects (such as crew survivability) better than the Lancaster, the Halifax suffered in terms of altitude performance and was redeployed toward the end of the war as a heavy transport and glider tug, with several variants being specifically built as such, including the HP.70 Halton.

Postwar

After the war, the British Government sought tenders for jet bombers to carry the nation's nuclear deterrent. The three types produced were known as the V-Bombers, and Handley Page's contribution was the HP.80 Victor, a four-engined, crescent-winged design. This aircraft remained in service (as a tanker aircraft) well beyond the demise of the company which created it.

In 1947 Handley Page bought some of the assets of the bankrupt Miles Aircraft company. These assets include existing designs, tools and jigs, most notably for the Miles M.52 supersonic research aircraft, and the Miles site at Woodley, near Reading. The operation was named Handley Page (Reading) Ltd, a company constituted to buy and operate the assets formed out of the inactive Handley Page Transport Ltd. The most significant of the inherited designs became the Herald airliner. Designs from the Reading site used the initials HPR ("Handley Page (Reading)").

Demise
Unlike other large British aircraft manufacturers, Handley Page resisted the government's pressure to merge into larger entities. By the late 1960s, the British aviation industry was dominated by two companies: Hawker Siddeley and the British Aircraft Corporation.

Unable to compete for government orders or build large commercial aircraft, Handley Page produced its final notable Handley Page design, the Jetstream. This was a small turboprop-powered commuter aircraft, with a pressurised cabin and a passenger capacity of 12 to 18. It was designed primarily for the United States "feederliner" market.

Although successful, the Jetstream was too late to save Handley Page, and the company went into voluntary liquidation in March 1970 and was wound up after 61 years trading under the same name. The Jetstream lived on, the design being purchased and produced by Scottish Aviation at Prestwick, continuing after the company was bought by British Aerospace in 1977.

Sites

Radlett Aerodrome was opened in 1929 as a grass aerodrome for Handley Page Civil Aircraft. Its runway was extended in 1939 to enable production of Halifax bombers. By the time of its closure the airfield had two runways:

 03/21 approximately 
 15/33 approximately 

Most of the towers, hangars and runways were demolished in the 1970s after the Company was terminated. The M25 Motorway now runs on the south side of the site, with Lafarge Aggregates now owning the remainder. The runway surface was removed and replaced with grass, but a shadow remains when viewed from the air.

The aerodrome was used in the 1962 film, The Iron Maiden.

Products

Designations

Handley Page originally used a letter sequence to designate types (i.e. A, B, C etc.). Beginning with the model E, the letter was used in combination with a slash and a number that referred to the installed horsepower, at least initially. However the 100 in O/100 indicated the type's 100-foot wingspan, while other designs it may or may not have been meaningful other than as a design sequence. By 1923, the company had come to the end of the alphabet and had begun reusing earlier letters, but this would have become confusing, so from 1924 they assigned the letters HP and a sequential number to indicate the model, with previous aircraft being retroactively assigned numbers in the new sequence, starting with the Type A as the HP.1. Thus the O/400 became the HP.16 and the W.8 the HP.18. Unbuilt projects were skipped from this sequence.

When the assets of Miles Aircraft were taken over, the latter's Reading design office used HPR for Handley Page Reading, followed by a number as with the HPR.1 Marathon.

Designs

First Letter Designation Sequence (used to 1923)
Type A – 1909 Bluebird monoplane
Type B – 1909 biplane
Type C – 1910 monoplane, did not fly, rebuilt from Type A
Type D – 1911 Antiseptic monoplane
Type E/50 – 1911 Antiseptic monoplane
Type F/70 – 1912 military monoplane with side by side seating
Type G/100 – 1913 biplane
Type H – 1913 monoplane projects, developments of type E & F
Type I & J – skipped
Type K/35 – 1913 biplane project, scaled down type G
Type L/200 – 1914 transatlantic biplane – never flew
 Type M/200 – 1914 biplane project
 Type MS/200 – 1914 seaplane biplane project
 Type N/80 – 1914 biplane project
Type O – twin-engined O/100 & O/400 bombers, and O/7, O/10 & O/11 airliners
 Type P/320 – 1916 HP.13 triplane project
Type Q – skipped
Type R/200 – HP.14 biplane/triplane for specification N.2B.
Type S/400 – O/400 floatplane project
Type T/400 – 1917 flying boat project
Type U – skipped
Type V/1500 four engine heavy bomber
Type W/400, W.4, W.8, W.9 & W.10 airliners
Type X/4B – Airco DH.9A fitted with slotted monoplane wing

Second Letter Designation Sequence (1923-1924)
Type C/7 Handcross – 1924  biplane day bomber, letter reused
Type D/4 – HP.29 transport projects
Type D – HP.32 Hamlet
Type E – HP.31 Harrow
Type F – HP.37 O.22/26 shipboard fighter project
Type H – HP.34 Hare
Type M – HP.36 Hinaidi II
Type S – HP.21 monoplane fighter
Type T – HP.19 Hanley
Type Ta – HP.25 Hendon

Numerical Designations (1924-1970)
HP.1 – Type A monoplane
HP.2 – Type B biplane
HP.3 – Type C monoplane, never flew
HP.4 – Type D monoplane
HP.5 – Type E monoplane
HP.6 – Type F monoplane
HP.7 – Type G biplane
HP.8 – Type L biplane, never flew
HP.9 – biplane project
HP.10 – scout project
HP.11 – O/100 twin-engined bomber
HP.12 – O/400 twin-engined bomber
HP.13 – triplane project
HP.14 – prototype naval reconnaissance
HP.15 – V/1500 four-engined bomber
HP.16 – W400 airliner
HP.17 – Airco DH.9 fitted with wing slots
HP.18 Hamilton – W8 airliner
HP.19 Hanley  – torpedo bomber
HP.20 – Airco DH.9A fitted with slotted monoplane wing
HP.21 – monoplane fighter for US Navy
HP.22 – single-seat sport monoplane for Lympne light aircraft trials
HP.23 – single-seat sport monoplane for Lympne light aircraft trials
HP.24 Hyderabad – biplane heavy bomber 
HP.25 Hendon – torpedo bomber 
HP.26 Hamilton – W8 airliner
HP.27 Hampstead – W9 airliner
HP.28 Handcross –  biplane day bomber
HP.29 – transport project
HP.30 – W.10 airliner
HP.31 Harrow – carrier-based torpedo bomber and reconnaissance aircraft
HP.32 Hamlet –  six-passenger monoplane airliner
HP.33 Hinaidi I and Clive I – heavy bomber & transport
HP.35 Clive II – heavy bomber
HP.36 Hinaidi II – twin-engine bomber
HP.37 – O.22/26 shipboard fighter project
HP.38 Heyford I – prototype biplane heavy night bomber
HP.39 Gugnunc – experimental STOL/safety biplane
HP.40 – biplane seaplane project for Japan for 3MR4 design
HP.41 – M.5/28 torpedo biplane project
HP.42 – eastern biplane airliner
HP.43 – three-engined biplane bomber transport
HP.44 Hinaidi III – twin-engine bomber
HP.45 – western biplane airliner
HP.46 – M.1/30 torpedo bomber
HP.47 – G.4/31 bomber & torpedo bomber
HP.48 – single-engine civil transport project 
HP.49 – skipped
HP.50 Heyford – production variant, biplane heavy night bomber
HP.51 – prototype bomber transport for C.26/31
HP.52 Hampden I – medium bomber
HP.53 – bomber project for Sweden, led to the HP.52 Hereford
HP.54 Harrow – monoplane heavy bomber
HP.55 – twin-engine heavy bomber design for B.1/35
HP.56 – twin-engine heavy bomber design for B.13/36
HP.57 Halifax Mk.I – four-engined heavy bomber
HP.58 Halifax Mk.II – four-engined heavy bomber project; cancelled due to armament problems
HP.59 Halifax Mk.II – four-engined heavy bomber
HP.60 Halifax Mk.IV – heavy bomber project for B.1/39, not built
HP.61 Halifax Mk.III – four-engined heavy bomber
HP.62 Hampden Mk.II – medium bomber
HP.63 Halifax Mk.V/VI/VII – four-engined heavy bomber
HP.64 Halifax transport – project
HP.65 Super Halifax – project with low drag  wing, turbo supercharged Hercules engines.
HP.66 Hastings B.I – Halifax project for spec. B.27/43, provisional name, abandoned at end of war.
HP.67 Hastings C.I – military transport
HP.68 Hermes I – airliner
HP.69 Hastings Mark II – Halifax project with turbo-blower exhaust Hercules 100, provisional name. Order cancelled 1944
HP.70 Halifax Mk.VIII & Halton – transport & airliner
HP.71 Halifax Mk.IX – four-engined heavy bomber
HP.72 – military transport project to specification C.15/45
HP.73 Hastings C.III – transport project
HP.74 Hermes II – airliner
HP.75 Manx – tailless research aircraft
HP.76 – civil transport project
HP.77 – civil transport project
HP.78 – civil transport project
HP.79 Hermes III – project airliner
HP.80 Victor – four-engined bomber
HP.81 Hermes IV – airliner
HP.82 Hermes V – airliner
HP.83 – civil transport project
HP.84 – civil transport project
HP.85 – civil transport project
HP.86 – civil transport project
HP.87 – 1/3 scale Victor project
HP.88 – Victor research aircraft, wings and tail on Supermarine Attacker
HP.89 Hastings C.VI – transport project
HP.90 Hermes IA – project civil freighter
HP.91 – lightened Hermes project
HP.92 – lightened Hermes project
HP.93 – Dufaylite wing for Miles Messenger
HP.94 Hastings C.4 – VIP transport project
HP.95 Hastings C.3 – transport project for RNZAF
HP.96 – Victor military transport project
HP.97 – Victor civil airliner project
HP.98 – Victor target marker project
HP.99 – bomber project
HP.100 – reconnaissance bomber to OR.330
HP.101 – Victor military transport project
HP.102 – airliner project
HP.103 – conversion of Jet Provost
HP.104 – Victor bomber phase 3 project
HP.105 – transport project
HP.106 – missile projects
HP.107 – bomber project
HP.108 – transport project
HP.109 – transport project
HP.110 – transport project
HP.112 – flying jeep project
HP.113 – transport project
HP.114 – Victor bomber phase 6 project
HP.115 – low speed delta wing research aircraft
HP.116 – freighter project
HP.117 – airliner project
HP.118 – VTOL jeep project
HP.119 – VTOL jeep project
HP.120 – VTOL jeep project
HP.122 – OR.351 VTOL transport project
HP.123 – OR.351 Victor transport aircraft project
HP.124 – military Herald project 
HP.125 – military VTOL Herald NMBR-4 project 
HP.126 Aerobus – airliner project
HP.127 – jet Herald project 
HP.128 – supersonic transport project
HP.129 – scaled-down Herald project
HP.130 – HS.125 project
HP.131 – military Herald project for Belgium
HP.132 – military STOL Herald project
HP.133 – military STOL Herald project
HP.134 – Ogee Aerobus project
HP.135 – global transport project
HP.137 Jetstream – twin-turboprop feederliner

Handley Page (Reading) designs
HPR.1 Marathon – airliner
HPR.2 Basic Trainer – basic trainer
HPR.3 Herald – airliner
HPR.4 Herald – turbine Herald project 
HPR.5 Marathon – engine testbed
HPR.6 – transport project
HPR.7 Dart Herald – airliner
HPR.8 – car ferry transport project

See also 
 Aerospace industry in the United Kingdom
 Norman Thompson Flight Company
 Hedley Hazelden – Handley Page test pilot

References
Notes

Bibliography
Barnes, C.H. Handley Page Aircraft since 1907 London:, 1987 (2nd Ed, Rev. Derek N James) 
 Buttler, Tony. British Secret Projects: Fighters & Bombers 1935–1950. Hinckley: Midland Publishing, 2004. .

External links

Short history of the company written for the Centennial of Flight
Pride and Priority, Musker, 2009 A history of the invention of the slotted or slatted wing
Engines of Our Ingenuity

 
Defunct aircraft manufacturers of the United Kingdom
Manufacturing companies established in 1909
Manufacturing companies disestablished in 1970
Aircraft industry in London
Defunct companies based in London
1909 establishments in England
1970 disestablishments in England
British companies disestablished in 1970
British companies established in 1909